Štěpán Kodeda (5 February 1988 – 30 March 2015) was a Czech orienteering competitor, and twice junior world champion.

Career
Štěpán was a runner of the Swedish club IFK Mora in Dalarna from 2005 until 2010, when he changed to the Finnish club MS Parma. He achieved many good team results as the 7th place in Tiomila's Relay 2008, where he ran the first for Dalarna's team exchanging 6th among 347 runners. Starting in 2006 he also ran for Sportcentrum Jičín in the Czech Republic and since 2009 for Club Esportiu Farra-O in Spain.

In 2007, he became Junior World Champion in relay in Dubbo, Australia together with Jan Benes and Adam Chromy. In 2008, he won a gold medal in sprint distance at the Junior World Championships in Göteborg, Sweden.

His best results at the World Orienteering Championships were an 18th place in the 2011 sprint final in Savoie, France, and an 18th place in the 2013 long distance in Vuokatti, Finland.

Death
Kodeda died on 30 March 2015 in Prague, after having been seriously injured in a traffic accident.

See also
 Czech orienteers
 List of orienteers
 List of orienteering events

References

External links
 
 Profile at Český svaz orientačního běhu

1988 births
2015 deaths
Czech orienteers
Male orienteers
Foot orienteers
Sportspeople from Plzeň
Junior World Orienteering Championships medalists